Bucyrus Bratwurst Festival is an annual celebration of bratwurst in Bucyrus, Ohio, United States. Bucyrus is recognized as the "Bratwurst Capital of America."

The festival includes musical performances and a festival queens pageant.

History
The festival was originally named Colonel Crawford Days before taking the name Bucyrus Bratwurst Festival in 1968. 52 years later, the first event casualty occurred: the COVID-19 pandemic caused officials to scrap the festival & defer to 2021.

References

Further reading

External links
Official Website
Old Website
Ohio Festivals & Events Association - Bucyrus Bratwurst Festival

Meat festivals
Food and drink festivals in the United States
Festivals in Ohio
Tourist attractions in Crawford County, Ohio
Bratwurst Festival